The 9th Vietnam Film Festival was held from November 28 to December 2, 1990, in Nha Trang, Vietnam, with the slogan: "For artistic creativity and perfecting socialist Vietnamese people, for the development of national cinema" (Vietnamese: "Vì sự sáng tạo nghệ thuật và hoàn thiện con người Việt Nam xã hội chủ nghĩa, vì sự phát triển của nền điện ảnh dân tộc").

Event 
This film festival has 108 films participating. For the first time, the festival opened an additional film section for the direct-to-video feature film category.

There is not a single Golden Lotus for feature film, direct-to-video film, children and animated film. The jury only awarded the Golden Lotus for two documentaries about Leader Hồ Chí Minh: "Hồ Chí Minh: Chân dung một con người" and "Hồ Chí Minh: Hình ảnh của Người".

The film "Gánh xiếc rong" was highly appreciated but also caused a lot of controversy among the judges. In the end, it was only received the Silver Lotus award.

Awards

Feature film

Direct-to-video

Documentary/Science film

Children/Animated film

Children

Animated

Notes

References 

Vietnam Film Festival
Vietnam Film Festival
1990 in Vietnam